George W. Barker (February 22, 1804 - April 7, 1873) was an American businessman and public official in Vermont and Wisconsin.  He was notable for his service as United States Marshal for the District of Vermont (1835-1837), Sheriff of Washington County, Vermont (1843-1845), and Judge of Manitowoc County, Wisconsin (1864-1869).

Biography
George W. Barker was born in Randolph, Vermont on February 22, 1804, the son of Daniel Barker and Anna (Lathrop) Barker.  He was raised and educated in Randolph, where he went into business as the proprietor of the Randolph Hotel.  Barker later sold his holdings in Randolph and relocated to Montpelier where he worked as an auctioneer and was employed as an officer of the Vermont House of Representatives.  In 1833, Barker was appointed a deputy sheriff of Washington, County.  Active in the Democratic Party, in 1835 he was appointed United States Marshal for the District of Vermont, succeeding Heman Lowry.  He served until 1837, when Lowry returned to the Marshal's position.  In 1836, he was hired by Montpelier's village government to conduct a census of its population and businesses.  From 1837 to 1840, Barker served as Montpelier's postmaster.

In 1839, Barker and partner J. T. Martson purchased Montpelier's Vermont Patriot newspaper, a leading Democratic outlet.  Other ventures in which Barker was interested included acting as the sales agent for several Vermont counties in retailing two patent medicines, Goelicke's Matchless Sanative and Phelps' Compound Tomato Pills.  From 1843 to 1846, Barker served as Washington County Sheriff.

In the 1840s and 1850s, Barker received construction contracts during the creation of the Central Vermont Railroad and his successful execution made him wealthy.  He then received contracts to construct portions of the Rutland and Washington Railroad; when this venture failed during the Panic of 1857, Barker lost his fortune and moved to Painesville, Ohio.  His railroad construction efforts there also proved unsuccessful, and Barker moved to Manitowoc, Wisconsin.

In Wisconsin, Barker undertook construction for the Appleton and New London Railway (later the Milwaukee, Lake Shore and Western Railroad).  The railroad was a success, which enabled Barker to restore his finances.  Still active in politics as a Democrat, Barker served as Manitowoc County Judge from 1864 to 1869.

Barker died in Manitowoc on April 7, 1873.  He was buried at Evergreen Cemetery in Manitowoc.

Family
In 1827, Barker married Julia Geer of Chaplin, Connecticut.  She died in 1864 and in 1865 he married Mary Coventry, the widow of Washington Goodnow.  With his first wife, Barker was the father of a son, George (1837-1851).

References

Sources

Internet

Newspapers

Books

External links

Notes

1804 births
1873 deaths
People from Randolph, Vermont
People from Montpelier, Vermont
People from Manitowoc, Wisconsin
Vermont Democrats
Vermont sheriffs
Vermont postmasters
United States Marshals
Wisconsin Democrats
Wisconsin state court judges
Burials in Wisconsin
19th-century American judges